Ayukokata També Ndip (born June 12, 1995) is a Cameroonian football player.

Career
També signed with USL club Colorado Springs Switchbacks on 25 January 2018.

References

External links
Switchbacks bio

1995 births
Living people
Cameroonian footballers
Cameroonian expatriate footballers
A.D. Isidro Metapán footballers
Colorado Springs Switchbacks FC players
Association football defenders
USL Championship players